Elections were held in Illinois on November 5, 1996.

Primaries were held March 19, 1996.

Election information

Turnout
For the primaries, turnout was 29.46%, with 1,804,626 ballots cast (with 902,635 Democratic ballots, 868,030 Republican ballots,  1,993 Libertarian, 498 Harold Washington, and 31,470 nonpartisan ballots cast).

For the general election, turnout was 66.30%, with 4,418,270 ballots cast.

Straight-ticket voting
Illinois had a straight-ticket voting option in 1996. This would be the last Illinois election with straight-ticket voting, as it would be abolished in Illinois in 1997.

Federal elections

United States President

Illinois voted for the Democratic Party ticket of Bill Clinton and Al Gore.

United States Senate

Democrat Dick Durbin was elected to succeed outgoing Democratic Senator Paul Simon.

United States House

All 20 of Illinois’ seats in the United States House of Representatives were up for election in 1996.

Both the Democratic and Republican parties flipped one seat held by the other party, leaving the party the composition of Illinois' House delegation 10 Democrats and 10 Republicans.

State elections

State Senate
Some of the seats of the Illinois Senate were up for election in 1996. Republicans retained control of the Illinois Senate, which they had held since 1993, having secured a majority from the 1992 election.

State House of Representatives
All of the seats in the Illinois House of Representatives were up for election in 1996. Democrats flipped control of the Illinois House of Representatives, which had been held by Republicans since 1995 after they had won a majority in the 1994 election.

Judicial elections
Judicial elections were held.

Local elections
Local elections were held. These included county elections, such as the Cook County elections.

References

 
Illinois